Lipinia pulchella, known commonly  as the yellow-striped slender tree skink or beautiful lipinia, is a species of skink, a lizard in the family Scincidae. The species is endemic to the Philippines.

Subspecies
Three subspecies are recognized as being valid, including the nominotypical subspecies.
Lipinia pulchella levitoni 
Lipinia pulchella pulchella 
Lipinia pulchella taylori 

Nota bene: A trinomial authority in parentheses indicates that the subspecies was originally described in a genus other than Lipinia.

Etymology
The specific name, levitoni, is in honor of American herpetologist Alan Edward Leviton (born 1930).<ref>Beolens, Bo; Watkins, Michael; Grayson, Michael (2011). The Eponym Dictionary of Reptiles. Baltimore: Johns Hopkins University Press. xiii + 296 pp. . (Lipinia pulchella levitoni, p. 157; </ref>

The specific name, taylori, is in honor of American herpetologist Edward Harrison Taylor (1889–1978).

The skink is found on trunks of trees in the dipterocarp or submontane tropical moist forests.

ReproductionL. pulchella is oviparous.

References

Further reading
Boulenger GA (1887). Catalogue of the Lizards in the British Museum (Natural History). Second Edition. Volume III. ... Scincidæ ... London: Trustees of the British Museum (Natural History). (Taylor and Francis, printers). xii + 575 pp. + Plates I-XL. (Lygosoma pulchellum, pp. 254-255 + Plate XVII, figures 1, 1a, 1b).
Brown WC, Alcala AC (1956). "A review of the Philippine lizards of the genus Lygosoma (Leiolopisma) ". Occasional Papers, Natural History Museum, Stanford University (3): 1–10. (Lygosoma pulchellum taylori, new subspecies, p. 8).
Brown WC, Alcala AC (1963). "Additions to the leiolopismid lizards known from the Philippines, with descriptions of a new species and subspecies". Proceedings of the Biological Society of Washington 76: 69–79. (Lygosoma pulchellum levitoni, new subspecies, pp. 78–79).
Gray JE (1845). Catalogue of the Specimens of Lizards in the Collection of the British Museum. London: Trustees of the British Museum. (Edward Newman, printer). xxviii + 289 pp. (Lipinia pulchella'', new species, p. 84). 

Lipinia
Reptiles of the Philippines
Reptiles described in 1845
Taxa named by John Edward Gray